The Miss Puerto Rico's Outstanding Teen competition is a pageant that selects a representative for the country of Puerto Rico in the Miss America's Outstanding Teen pageant.
Tanysha Acevedo was crowned Miss Puerto Rico's Outstanding Teen in July 2015. She went and represented Puerto Rico at the Miss America's Outstanding Teen 2016 pageant.

Results summary
The year in parentheses indicates the year of the Miss America's Outstanding Teen competition the award/placement.

Awards

Other awards

 Miss Photogenic: Daniela Sofia Ramirez (2014)

Winners

Puerto Rico
Puerto Rican culture